According to oral Tradition, Saraniyas, trained in shining and sharpening swords, had left their ancestral villages in Rajasthan with the army of Rana Pratap to fight the Moghul emperor Akbar. Their job was the upkeep of weapons of the troops, while the womenfolk tagged along to "entertain" the soldiers in spare time.

With Rana Pratap defeated in the war and deciding not to return to Chittorgarh to prepare for another battle, his surviving troops were scattered.

The Saraniyas took shelter in a desert land in Tharad, which was later named Wadia (village). With the only trade they had expertise in dying a natural death — with the use of fire arms — the men lost their only means of livelihood. Instead of learning another trade, the men became dependent on their womenfolk.

Trained in singing and dancing, the Saraniya women started "entertaining" the rich landlords and small princes. But with the abolition of the zamindari system after Independence, prostitution became the only source of income for their families.

References

External links
 http://spirituality.knoji.com/the-story-of-wadia/

History of Rajasthan